John Springer Walmsley Jr. (January 7, 1920 – September 14, 1951) was a bomber pilot in the United States Army Air Forces after World War II and the United States Air Force during the Korean War. Walmsley rose to the rank of captain and posthumously received the Medal of Honor for his heroic actions on September 14, 1951, above Yangdok, North Korea during a bombing mission.

Born in Baltimore, Maryland, Walmsley joined the Army Air Forces and spent the 1940s as an instructor pilot in the United States and Japan, but did not see combat. He was deployed with the 8th Bombardment Squadron to the Korean War, flying B-26 Invader aircraft. During this time, Walmsley volunteered for a risky bombing campaign, Operation Strangle.

During one of the bombing missions, Walmsley's aircraft spotted a Chinese supply train moving by cover of darkness. He attacked it until he expended his ammunition and called for backup. He then used a spotlight on his aircraft to illuminate the train for subsequent attacks, exposing himself and his crew to intense anti-aircraft fire, which he did not avoid. The mission resulted in the successful destruction of the train, and Walmsley was killed when his heavily damaged aircraft crashed.

Early life and career
Walmsley was born on January 7, 1920, in Baltimore, Maryland. He entered service from the city, as well, joining the United States Army Air Forces in 1944. Walmsley served mainly as a flying instructor during World War II, never seeing combat. Walmsley was then transferred to Japan in 1946 as part of the post-war occupation of that country. There, he flew bomber aircraft from 1946 to 1949. After this, he attended Air Tactical School, graduating in July 1949.

Korean War

In June 1951, Walmsley was assigned to the 8th Bombardment Squadron, 3rd Bombardment Wing, Fifth United States Air Force which flew the Douglas B-26 Invader in Korea during the Korean War. During this time, he was described as "cheerful and popular." During the early phase of the war, missions included fairly simple bombing runs with  fragmentation bombs and .50 caliber machine guns. In the summer of 1951, the two sides of the conflict appeared to be reaching a truce one year after the war began. However, as the negotiations continued, North Korean and Chinese troops began moving supplies to the front lines while negotiations were taking place. The move caused United Nations (UN) troops to counter with "Operation Strangle," a new interdiction campaign designed to attack supply lines using arclights, bright lamps attached to the bottom of the aircraft, which would spot truck convoys moving at night. The arclights, with an estimated 80 million candlepower, would easily illuminate supply trains but also expose the UN aircraft to antiaircraft fire. As such, North Korean and Chinese trains were heavily equipped with such guns, and the valleys through which they traveled were heavily fortified with anti-air capability. Walmsley was one of the first pilots to volunteer for the dangerous mission.

By September 1951, Walmsley had been promoted to captain and had flown 20 missions using the arclights. At 55 or 60 missions, the "tour" would have been complete using the risky weapons. A September 12 raid was extremely successful; in it, Walmsley's B-26 attacked a convoy with  bombs, destroying or damaging 16 trucks, and forcing many of the vehicle drivers off the road. Emboldened by this successful mission, Walmsley opted on September 14 to bring his bomber named "Skillful 13" (tail number 44-34314), to a mission alone in North Korea.

Medal of Honor  action and death
On September 14 Walmsley's aircraft, Skillful 13, launched from Kunsan alone on a mission to search for truck convoys in North Korea. The aircraft was crewed by Walmsley as well as bombardier/navigator Second Lieutenant William D. Mulkins, photomapper Captain Philip W. Browning, and air gunner Master Sergeant George Morar. As the aircraft neared Yangdok,  behind North Korean lines, it spotted an armed locomotive hauling supplies south in the middle of the night. Walmsley immediately had his crew attack the locomotive. They expended their complement of bombs in striking the locomotive, damaging it but not stopping it. Walmsley then called in another B-26 Invader from Kunsan, and upon its arrival volunteered to illuminate the locomotive with his aircraft's arclight. Walmsley's aircraft passed over the locomotive three times, illuminating it but, taking antiaircraft fire in the process from both the train itself and emplacements along the rail line, damaging the aircraft. Walmsley's actions not only illuminated the train but also allowed his aircraft to absorb most of its fire, sparing the other aircraft from attack. He did not take any evasive action against the North Korean anti-aircraft fire so as to keep the train illuminated for the other American aircraft.

After the third pass, the train was destroyed by the combined firepower of the two bombers, together with its cargo. However, Walmsley's aircraft was severely damaged. Its wings began trailing fuel, which ignited. As the lone survivor of the crash, Morar was captured and spent the remainder of the war in a prison camp, though he survived. Walmsley was declared missing in action after the mission, and his status was listed as "presumed dead" after the end of the war.

Walmsley's crew each received a Distinguished Flying Cross for extraordinary heroism. Walmsley however, was awarded the Medal of Honor posthumously on June 12, 1954. The medal was presented to his widow at Bolling Air Force Base in Washington, D.C. Four weeks after the mission, the arclights and Operation Strangle were abandoned, as leaders felt the risks and casualties of the operation outweighed the benefits.

Military awards
Walmsley's military decorations and awards include:

Medal of Honor citation
Walmsley was one of four U.S. Air Force members to be awarded the Medal of Honor in the Korean War. All four were pilots who were killed in action. They were the only members of the U.S. Air Force to receive the Army version of the medal (the USAF version was first awarded during the Vietnam War). His Medal of Honor citation reads:

See also

List of Medal of Honor recipients
List of Korean War Medal of Honor recipients
George A. Davis Jr., USAF-MOH
Charles J. Loring Jr., USAF-MOH
Louis J. Sebille, USAF-MOH

References

Sources

1920 births
1951 deaths
American military personnel killed in the Korean War
United States Air Force Medal of Honor recipients
United States Air Force officers
Recipients of the Air Medal
Korean War recipients of the Medal of Honor
Aviators killed by being shot down
United States Army Air Forces bomber pilots of World War II
United States Air Force personnel of the Korean War
American Korean War bomber pilots
Military personnel missing in action
Recipients of the Distinguished Flying Cross (United States)
Military personnel from Baltimore
Aviators from Maryland